The 2013 Croatian local elections were held on 19 May, with the second round held on 2 June where necessary.

The elections were held to elect members of city councils, mayors, members of county councils and county prefects. The turnout was 47%, and 43% in the second round.

Summary of mayoral results
In Zagreb, populist right-wing and former Social Democrat Milan Bandić won 47.9% of the vote against Social Democrat Health Minister Rajko Ostojić's 22.7%. Bandic received a two-thirds majority in the second round.

The incumbent mayor of Split, Željko Kerum, placed third with 18.54% of the vote and was eliminated from the second round which was narrowly won by the Socialist candidate Ivo Baldasar.

In Slavonia's largest city, Osijek, the HDSSB candidate, mayor Krešimir Bubalo, won 36.3% of the vote in the first round, but lost to Independent candidate Ivan Vrkić, who gained 27.8% in the second round.

Results

Counties

City of Zagreb

City of Split

References

Elections in Croatia
2013 elections in Croatia
2013 in Croatia
Local elections in Croatia
May 2013 events in Europe
June 2013 events in Europe